Riddick's Rules of Procedure is a parliamentary authority - a book explaining the parliamentary procedure, including the rules, ethics, and customs governing meetings and other operations of the United States Senate. It was written by Floyd M. Riddick and co-authored by Miriam Butcher. The book is based on Riddick's experience as parliamentarian of the Senate as well as the procedures of assemblies using parliamentary manuals such as Robert's Rules of Order, and is arranged in a glossary style.

Riddick's Rules is a book of common parliamentary usage for civic clubs and organizations. Riddick also wrote Riddick's Senate Procedure that contains contemporary precedents and practices of the US Senate and is still being updated and used by the Senate. Riddick was associated with the American Institute of Parliamentarians (AIP) where he founded an annual Practicum (to study parliamentary procedure) that now bears his name. His book has been used by AIP in their teachings, workshops, and materials.

References

Editions
 
 

Parliamentary authority
United States Senate
American political books
Parliamentary procedure